Clifford Burton Barrows (April 6, 1923 – November 15, 2016) was a longtime music and program director for the Billy Graham Evangelistic Association. He had been a part of the Graham organization since 1949. Barrows was best known as the host of Graham's weekly Hour of Decision radio program, and the song leader and choir director for the crusade meetings.

Life 
Barrows was ordained as a Baptist minister in 1944, and served as an assistant pastor at Temple Baptist Church in St. Paul, Minnesota through 1945. Barrows joined Graham at a rally in Asheville, North Carolina that year, and remained with Graham ever since.

He appeared in the 1970 film His Land with British pop singer Cliff Richard. The film reviews Biblical events as both Cliffs took a pilgrimage to Israel. It was produced by Graham's production company, World Wide Pictures.

In 1988, Barrows was inducted into the Gospel Music Hall of Fame in Nashville, Tennessee by the Gospel Music Association.

In 1996 he was also inducted into the Religious Broadcasting Hall of Fame by the National Religious Broadcasters. Barrows' longtime colleague, the late Canadian-born singer George Beverly Shea, is also a member of both halls of fame.

Barrows died at a hospital in Charlotte, North Carolina, on November 15, 2016, at the age of 93.

Personal life
Barrows and his first wife Wilma Newell (1925–1994) had five children; Bonnie (born 1948), Robert (1950), Betty Ruth (1953), Clifford ("Bud") (1955), and William Burton (1962).

In 1995, Barrows married Ann Prince and resided in Marvin, North Carolina.

See also 
 Hour of Decision
 Mr. Texas (film 1951)
 Los Angeles Crusade (1949)

References

External links
 Billy Graham Evangelistic Association: Cliff Barrows biography
 Papers of Cliff Barrows Billy Graham Center Archives, Wheaton, IL
 

1923 births
2016 deaths
American gospel singers
American male singers
American performers of Christian music
Billy Graham
People from Ceres, California